Campomanesia lineatifolia is a species of plant in the family Myrtaceae. Common names include guabiraba and perfume guava.

Description
It is an evergreen tree with edible fruit that typically reaches 5 – 10 m in height. The fruits are berries (3 – 6 cm diameter, up to 140 g weight) and are gathered from trees growing either wild or under cultivation. The aromatic yellow fruit is eaten raw, made into juices or pulped for use. A perfume can be extracted from the leaves. An early illustration of the fruit was made in the mid seventeenth century by Dorothea Eliza Smith.

It has been used in traditional medicine to alleviate gastrointestinal disorders.

Distribution and habitat
It is found in western South America - central and northern Brazil, Peru, Colombia, Ecuador. It grows in regions with an average temperature of 22 – 30 °C with annual rainfall above 1,500 mm.

References 

lineatifolia